Portals is a studio album by English DJ and record producers Sub Focus and Wilkinson. It was released on 9 October 2020 by Virgin EMI Records. The album includes the singles "Illuminate", "Just Hold On", "Air I Breathe", "Turn the Lights Off" and "Freedom".

Background
Talking about the collaboration and releasing an album together, Sub Focus and Wilkinson said, "We first linked up to make a track called 'Take It Up' in 2018 and we were really encouraged by the response. We headlined a big festival in the UK together and really saw the potential of us extending the partnership [...] we just didn't feel like anything that ambitious in terms of albums was being made in drum 'n' bass at the time and that became our mission for this record."

Singles
"Illuminate" was released as the lead single from the album on 13 September 2019. "Just Hold On" was released as the second single from the album on 24 April 2020. "Air I Breathe" was released as the third single from the album on 7 August 2020. "Turn the Lights Off" was released as the fourth single from the album on 5 October 2020. "Freedom" was released as the fifth single from the album on 8 January 2021, after the album's release. It was released along with a remix from both Sub Focus and Wilkinson, along with High Contrast.

Track listing

Charts

Release history

References

2020 albums
Sub Focus albums
Drum and bass albums